Born to Be Blue is a 2015 internationally co-produced drama film directed, produced and written by Robert Budreau. The film stars Ethan Hawke and Carmen Ejogo. It was shown in the Special Presentations section of the 2015 Toronto International Film Festival. The film is about American jazz musician Chet Baker, portrayed by Hawke.

Plot
The film is described as "semi-factual, semi-fictional". Variety'''s reviewer, Andrew Barker, noted that the film is "about a character who happens to share a name and a significant number of biographical similarities with Chet Baker, taking the legendary West Coast jazz musician's life as though it were merely a chord chart from which to launch an improvised set of new melodies". Set largely in 1966, Baker (portrayed by Ethan Hawke) is hired to play himself in a movie about his earlier years when he first tried heroin. He romances actress Jane Azuka (a fictional character, a composite of several of Baker's women in real life, portrayed here by Carmen Ejogo) but on their first date, Baker is attacked by thugs and his front teeth smashed. As Baker recovers from his injury, his embouchure is ruined and he is unable to play trumpet any better than a novice. Meanwhile, he must answer to a probation officer, and ensure he is employed, while sticking to his regimen of methadone treatment.

Cast

Production
In October 2014, it was announced that Ethan Hawke had joined the cast portraying the role of Chet Baker, with Robert Budreau directing from a screenplay he wrote. That same month, it was announced that Carmen Ejogo and Callum Keith Rennie had also joined the cast of the film. Filming took place in Sudbury, Ontario, in fall 2014.

The jazz score to the film was created by composer and pianist David Braid. The audio for trumpet performances in the film was done by Kevin Turcotte. Hawke had taken trumpet lessons from Ben Promane, and requested video of Turcotte recording, in order to mime the playing during the shoot.

Release
The film had its world premiere at the Toronto International Film Festival on 13 September 2015. Shortly after, IFC Films acquired U.S. distribution rights to the film. The film had a limited Canadian release on 11 March 2016, and a limited release in the United States two weeks later.

Critical receptionBorn to Be Blue received positive reviews from film critics, with Hawke's performance receiving praise. It holds an 88% "Certified Fresh" rating on review aggregator website Rotten Tomatoes, based on 100 reviews, with an average rating of 7/10 and critical consensus being: "Born to Be Blue benefits from a highlight-reel performance from Ethan Hawke and an impressionistic, non-hagiographic approach to Chet Baker's life and times". On Metacritic, the film holds a rating of 64 out of 100, based on 32 critics, indicating "generally favorable reviews".

Soundtrack album
Warner Music Canada released a collection of 14 tracks, with 12 arranged or composed by David Braid and 1 track each by Charles Mingus and Odetta. Two tracks feature Hawke's vocals.

See also
 My Foolish Heart, another film about the final days of Chet Baker.
 Miles Ahead, a similar film depicting the life of jazz trumpeter Miles Davis.

References

External links
 Official site (IFC Films)
 
 Born to Be Blue'' at Library and Archives Canada

2015 films
2015 drama films
2015 biographical drama films
2010s musical drama films
2010s English-language films
Canadian biographical drama films
Canadian musical drama films
English-language Canadian films
Films shot in Greater Sudbury
Entertainment One films
Films about interracial romance
Jazz films
Cultural depictions of Chet Baker
Films set in the 1960s
Biographical films about musicians
Films about heroin addiction
Films directed by Robert Budreau
2010s Canadian films